Prof. E. Bamfo-Kwakye Ph.D is a Ghanaian academic and a former Vice Chancellor of the Kwame Nkrumah University of Science and Technology.

Term as Vice Chancellor
Bamfo-Kwakye served as Vice Chancellor of KNUST from 1974 to 1983.

References

Living people
Vice-Chancellors of the Kwame Nkrumah University of Science and Technology
Vice-Chancellors of universities in Ghana
Presbyterian Boys' Senior High School alumni
Year of birth missing (living people)
Academic staff of Kwame Nkrumah University of Science and Technology